Moon, also spelled Mun, is a Korean family name, a single-syllable Korean given name, and an element in some two-syllable Korean given names. Its meaning differs based on the hanja used to write it.

Family name

As a family name, Moon is written with one hanja, meaning "writing" (글월 문 geulwol mun). The 2000 South Korean census found a total of 426,927 people and 132,881 households with this family name. They identified with 47 different surviving bon-gwan (origin of a clan lineage, not necessarily the actual residence of the clan members):

Nampyeong (Naju): 380,530 people and 118,491 households
Gangneung: 4,646 people and 1,493 households. They claim common ancestry with the Nampyeong Moon clan through Mun Jang-pil (문장필; 文章弼), a Goryeo Dynasty military figure.
Gamcheon: 4,382 people and 1,367 households
Papyeong (Paju): 2,687 people and 743 households
Gyeongju: 2,609 people and 844 households
Naju: 2,537 people and 765 households
Hampyeong: 2,194 people and 612 households
40 other bon-gwan with fewer than 2,000 people each: 27,342 people and 8,496 households

In a study by the National Institute of the Korean Language based on 2007 application data for South Korean passports, it was found that 73.5% of people with this surname spelled it in Latin letters as Moon in their passports, while another 26.4% spelled it as Mun.

Given name

Hanja
There are 14 hanja with the reading Moon on the South Korean government's official list of hanja which may be registered for use in given names; they are:

 (문 문 mun mun): "door"
 (물을 문 mureul mun): "to ask"
 (들을 문 teureul mun): "to listen"
 (글월 문 geulwol mun): "writing"
 (물 이름 문 mul ireum mun): the name of a body of water
 (따뜻할 문 ddaddeuthal mun): "warm"
 (무늬 문 munui mun): "design", "pattern"
 (들 문 deul mun): plural marker for people
 (목 벨 문 mok bel mun): "to decapitate"
 (입술 문 ipsul mun): "lips", "to kiss"
 (어지러울 문 eojireoul mun, 문란할 문 munnanhal mun): "dizziness", "disorder"
 (모기 문 mogi mun): "mosquito"
 (구름 무늬 문 gureum munui mun): "cloud patterned"
 (닦을 문 dakkeul mun): "to polish"

People
People with the single-syllable given name Moon include:
Mun of Balhae (reigned 737–793), third ruler of the Kingdom of Balhae

As name element
Korean names containing the element Moon include:
Moon-sik (masculine)
Moon-soo (masculine)
Ki-moon (masculine)

Notable people with the surname

See also
List of Korean family names
List of Korean given names

References

Korean-language surnames
Korean given names